Borovec pri Karlovici ( or ) is a small settlement in the Municipality of Velike Lašče in the traditional region of Lower Carniola in central Slovenia. The area is now included in the Central Slovenia Statistical Region.

Name
The name of the settlement was changed from Borovec to Borovec pri Karlovici in 1953.

References

External links

Borovec pri Karlovici on Geopedia

Populated places in the Municipality of Velike Lašče